Anderson Road is a major arterial road in Calgary, Alberta, Canada.  It runs from the city limits at Tsuut'ina Trail in the west to Deerfoot Trail in the east.  The road continues westwards into the Tsuu T'ina Nation as Buffalo Run Boulevard.  It is one of the few entrances to the Tsuu T'ina Nation and the only entrance from Calgary that must remain open at all times.

History
Anderson Road is named for the Anderson family, specifically for Andrew Anderson and Archie Anderson, two brothers who served with the Royal Navy and the Royal Air Force, respectively, in World War II.  Archie was a radio operator in the King's Own Calgary Tank Regiment, was part of the Dieppe Raid on August 19, 1942, and had also spent time as a German prisoner of war, The Anderson family home had been located on what is now Anderson Road, just west of 24 Street SW. Descendants of the Anderson family continue to live in the Calgary area and other parts of Alberta.

Prior to the road being named in their honour, Anderson Road conformed to Calgary's street numbering convention, and was known as 114 Avenue S. Anderson Road was originally to be the south leg of the Calgary Ring Road; however as the city grew the proposed alignment was moved south to Highway 22X. Prior to Deerfoot Trail being extended to Stoney Trail South, Anderson Road between Macleod Trail and Deerfoot Trail was designated as part of Highway 2 but is still part of bypass route which connects Highway 1 west and Highway 2 south.

Major intersections 
From west to east.

See also

Transportation in Calgary

References

Roads in Calgary